The 2018 Brasil Open was a tennis tournament played on indoor clay courts. It was the 18th edition of the Brasil Open, and part of the ATP World Tour 250 series of the 2018 ATP World Tour. It took place from February 26 through March 4, 2018, in São Paulo, Brazil.

Singles main-draw entrants

Seeds 

1 Rankings as of February 19, 2018.

Other entrants 
The following players received wildcards into the singles main draw:
  Thiago Monteiro
  Corentin Moutet
  Thiago Seyboth Wild

The following players received entry from the qualifying draw:
  Guilherme Clezar
  João Domingues
  Sebastian Ofner
  Renzo Olivo

Withdrawals 
Before the tournament
  Cedrik-Marcel Stebe → replaced by  Gastão Elias
  Jiří Veselý → replaced by  Carlos Berlocq

Doubles main-draw entrants

Seeds 

 1 Rankings as of February 19, 2018.

Other entrants 
The following pairs received wildcards into the doubles main draw:
  Thomaz Bellucci /  André Sá
  Dorian Descloix /  Gaël Monfils

The following pairs received entry as alternates:
  Pedro Bernardi /  Thiago Monteiro
  Fabrício Neis /  Renzo Olivo

Withdrawals 
Before the tournament
  Nicolás Jarry
  Gerald Melzer

During the tournament
  Pablo Cuevas

Retirements 
  Fabrício Neis

Champions

Singles 

  Fabio Fognini def.  Nicolás Jarry, 1–6, 6–1, 6–4

Doubles 

  Federico Delbonis /  Máximo González def.  Wesley Koolhof /  Artem Sitak, 6–4, 6–2.

External links